This is a listing of official releases by E Reece, an American rapper.

Albums

Mixtapes
 2009: Art & Commerce: The Mixtape
 2010: The RE: Introduction Mixtape

EPs
 2004: FarEye Vision
 2006: Next Up
 2011: The T.iM.E is Now

Singles
 2005: Drop That [Remix] (Sy Smith featuring E Reece)
 2007: Everything
 2007: Life Changes
 2008: How We Do
 2008: What U Need
 2009: Mic Check
 2009: Keepin It Movin'
 2010: Fly Hi
 2010: Confessions of a Dreamer (featuring Dasha)
 2010: Feel Good (featuring Othello)
 2011: Breakthrough (featuring Joy Jones)

Other Appearances

Music videos

References

Discographies of American artists